The Mt. Sinai Synagogue in Cheyenne, Wyoming was listed on the National Register of Historic Places in 2017.

Its original building was begun in 1915, and was the first permanent Jewish house of worship in the state of Wyoming.

The synagogue was founded by Eastern European and German Jews, with the assistance of the Homestead Acts and the Jewish Agricultural Society. The synagogue moved in 1951 to its current location.

References

Ashkenazi synagogues
German-American culture in Wyoming
German-Jewish culture in the United States
Buildings and structures completed in 1915
National Register of Historic Places in Laramie County, Wyoming
Synagogues in Wyoming